Cymothoe reinholdi, or Reinhold's creamy glider, is a butterfly in the family Nymphalidae. It is found in Nigeria, Cameroon, Gabon, the Republic of the Congo, the Central African Republic and the Democratic Republic of the Congo. The habitat consists of primary forests.

The larvae feed on Caseria congoensis.

Subspecies
Cymothoe reinholdi reinholdi (Nigeria: Cross River loop, Cameroon, Gabon, Congo)
Cymothoe reinholdi vitalis Rebel, 1914 (Central African Republic, central and north-eastern Democratic Republic of the Congo)

References

External links
Images representing Cymothoe reinholdi at Consortium for the Barcode of Life

Butterflies described in 1880
Cymothoe (butterfly)
Butterflies of Africa